The superior labial branches descend behind the Quadratus labii superioris, and are distributed to the skin of the upper lip, the mucous membrane of the mouth, and labial glands. They are joined, immediately beneath the orbit, by filaments from the facial nerve, forming with them the infraorbital plexus.

External links

Nerve plexus
Maxillary nerve